The ICW / IWCCW Tag-Team Championship was the top tag-team championship of International World Class Championship Wrestling between 1984 and 1995 where IWCCW closed down operations. Since the ICW/IWCCW championships were not given "world title" status by Pro Wrestling Illustrated, this championship was seen as a regional championship, although it was considered the top singles championship of the promotion. Initially ICW’s main title was the WWC World Tag Team Championship, through a talent exchange program and a close working relationship between ICW and WWC the Universal Title was promoted in the New England area as the main ICW title without ever mentioning the WWC name, nor was it presented as a title owned by ICW. When the arrangement came to an end in 1985 a specific “ICW Tag-Team Championship” was created with the lineage of the WWC Tag-Team title during the time of the working relationship. Because the championship is a professional wrestling championship, it is not won or lost competitively but instead by the decision of the bookers of a wrestling promotion. The championship is awarded after the chosen team "wins" a match to maintain the illusion that professional wrestling is a competitive sport.

Title history

Footnotes

References
General sources

Specific sources

International World Class Championship Wrestling championships
Tag team wrestling championships